Jakob "Jackie" Gerlich (September 21, 1925 – December 27, 1960) was born in Vienna as Leo Fuks, the third son of Regina and Abraham Fox  He was a circus entertainer most notable for his appearance in the 1939 American film The Wizard of Oz. 

He emigrated to America when he arrived in New York City on the S.S. President Roosevelt ocean liner on March 2, 1936 at the age of 10 years old as a member of the "Singer Midgets" group run by Leo Singer. In order to emigrate at such a young age, his older brother's name, Jakob, and identification were used, without his parents' consent, claiming he was born in 1917. He used the name ‘Jackie’ from then on. Even in other online sources today, he is credited with the name Jakob Gerlich. He worked as a clown and eventually became part of the Ringling Bros. and Barnum & Bailey Circus.

Wizard of Oz
Gerlich is most notable for being in The Wizard of Oz, where he played the red member of the Lollipop Guild. Jerry Maren and Harry Doll were the other two members of the Lollipop Guild in the film. He was only 14 years old when he made his acting break in The Wizard of Oz, three years after arriving in the United States.

Leopold von Singer was the manager of an entertainment troupe called The Singer Midgets and signed a contract with Metro-Goldwyn-Mayer to provide 124 proportionately-sized little people to play Munchkins in Oz. Gerlich was recruited because of his dwarfism and was paid $125 a week for his work. Though Gerlich is uncredited in the film, his name appears in Oz trivia articles and books.

In 2007, all 124 Munchkin actors in Oz were honored with a Star on the Hollywood Walk of Fame. For Gerlich this was a posthumous honor. Seven surviving Munchkin actors attended the ceremony, including Mickey Carroll, Ruth Duccini, Jerry Maren, Margaret Pellegrini, Meinhardt Raabe, Karl Slover and Clarence Swensen.

Maren said that due to previous engagements, the three members of the Lollipop guild did not stay in contact after Oz. In 2013 he stated "We pretty much separated because they all had previous engagements. Somebody had to go to Milwaukee, somebody had to go to Boston, New York, etc."

Other Roles
Gerlich's first acting experience was in the 1938 American Western Jed Buells The Terror Of Tiny Town, the world's only Western with an all-midget cast. Jakob was a part of the troupe of actors formerly called the Singer Midgets that Buell renamed Jed Buells Midgets.

Another acting experience was also an uncredited role when he played Bobby in the 1939 film East Side of Heaven.

Besides his small movie roles, Gerlich was a circus performer in the Ringling Bros. and Barnum & Bailey Circus.

Gerlich was interviewed by Mike Wallace on May 1, 1959.

On December 27, 1960, Gerlich died at the age of 35 in Sarasota, Florida, due to natural causes.

References

External links

1925 births
1960 deaths
Male actors from Vienna
Actors with dwarfism
American male film actors
Austrian emigrants to the United States
20th-century American male actors